This is a demography of the population of Guatemala including population density, ethnicity, education level, health of the populace, economic status, religious affiliations and other aspects of the population.

According to the 2018 census, 43.56% of the population is Indigenous including 41.66% Mayan, 1.77% Xinca, and 0.13% Garifuna (Mixed African and indigenous). Approximately 56% of the population is "non-Indigenous", referring to the Mestizo population (people of mixed European and indigenous descent) and the people of European origin. These people are called Ladino in Guatemala. The population is divided almost evenly between rural and urban areas.

About 65% of the population speak Spanish, with nearly all the rest speaking indigenous languages (there are 23 officially recognized indigenous languages).

Population

The proportion of the population below the age of 15 in 2010 was 41.5%, 54.1% were aged between 15 and 65 years of age, and 4.4% were aged 65 years or older.

Guatemala City is home to almost 3 million inhabitants. In 1900 Guatemala had a population of 1,885,000. 
Over the twentifirst century Guatemala's population grew by a factor of fourteen. Even though Guatemala's population grew by a factor of 14, it still wasn't the biggest jump in that region. Although Guatemala does have an increase in population, the annual population isn't the superior in that region of the world as well.

Population by departments
In Guatemala, there are 22 departments that make up the country. Each department has its own population, with Guatemala Department ranking at 1 with the highest population and El Progreso Department ranking at 22 with the lowest population.

According to the table, Guatemala Department accounts for 20% of the entire population in Guatemala, while El Progreso only accounts for 0.14% of the population. Sololá accounts for 2.7% of the population while ranking in the middle at 11. Overall, the rankings correlate to the percent of the population that each department contains.

Emigration
The Guatemalan civil war from 1960 to 1996 led to mass emigration, particularly Guatemalan immigration to the United States. According to the International Organization for Migration, the total number of emigrants increased  from 6,700 in the 1960s to 558,776 for the period 1995-2000; by 2005, the total number had reached 1.3 million. In 2013, the Migration Policy Institute (MPI) estimated that there were about 900,000 Guatemalan Americans (persons of Guatemalan origin in the United States).

Ethnic groups

Official 2018 statistics indicate that approximately 56% of the population is "non-Indigenous", referring to the Mestizo population of mixed indigenous and European origins (50-52%) and the people of European origin (14-26%), Most are of Spanish, German  and Italian descent. These people are called Ladino in Guatemala. Genetic testing indicates that Guatemalan Mestizos are of predominantly indigenous ancestry, although they have a high level of European ancestry as well.

Approximately 43.4% of the population is Indigenous and consist of 23 Maya groups and one non-Maya group. In 2012 these are divided as follows: K'iche 9.1%, 8.4% Kaqchikel, Mam 7.9%, 6.3% Q'eqchi', other Maya peoples 8.6%, 0.2% Indigenous non-Maya. They live all over the country, especially in the highlands. While the official censuses usually count around 40% of the Guatemalan population being indigenous, this percentage is actually much higher, with around 60% of Guatemalans being indigenous.

In 2002 Census, The Amerindian populations in Guatemala include the K'iche' 9.1%, Kaqchikel 8.4%, Mam 7.9% and Q'eqchi 6.3%. 8.6% belongs to other Maya groups, 0.4% belong to non-Maya Indigenous peoples. The whole Indigenous community in Guatemala is about 40.5% of the population.

The Maya Civilization ruled Guatemala and the surrounding regions until around 1521 A.D. Following 1521 A.D., Guatemala became a Spanish colony for approximately three centuries, until in 1821 when Guatemala won its independence. Since the independence of Guatemala, the country has experienced a wide range of governments, including civilian and military governments. In 1996, a peace treaty was signed by the government that ended internal conflicts within the region, which caused over 200,000 casualties and approximately one million refugees.

Historically, the ethnicity population in the Kingdom of Guatemala at the time of Independence amounted to nearly 600,000 Indians, 300,000 Castas (mostly Mestizos and a lesser number of Mulattos, Zambos, and Pardos), and 45,000 Criollos or Spaniards, with a very small number of English traders.

Other racial groups include numbers of Afro-Guatemalans, Afro-Mestizos, and Garifuna of mixed African and Indigenous Caribbean origins who live in the country's eastern end. Some Garifunas live mainly in Livingston, San Vicente and Puerto Barrios. They descend mainly from the Arawaks and Belizean Creoles.

There are also thousands of Jews residing in Guatemala. They are immigrants from Germany and Eastern Europe that arrived in the 19th century. Many immigrated during World War II. There are approximately 9,000 Jews living in Guatemala today. Most live in Guatemala City, Quezaltenango and San Marcos. Today, the Jewish community in Guatemala is made up of Orthodox Jews, Sephardi, Eastern European and German Jews.

In 2014, numerous members of the Hasidic communities Lev Tahor and Toiras Jesed began settling in the village of San Juan La Laguna. The mainstream Jewish community was reportedly dismayed and concerned that the arrival of communities with a more visible adherence to Judaism might stir up anti-Jewish sentiment. Despite the tropical heat, the members of the community continued to wear the traditional ancient Jewish clothing.

Guatemala has a community of East Asian descent, largely of Chinese and Korean origin. There are thousands of Arab Guatemalans descending from West Asian countries like Palestine, Syria, Jordan and Iraq. Some belong to Christian Churches while others to Islamic Mosques.

Vital statistics

UN estimates
The Population Department of the United Nations prepared the following estimates.

Vital statistics 

(C) = Census results.

Fertility and births (demographic and health surveys)
Total fertility rate (TFR) (wanted fertility rate) and crude birth rate (CBR):

Structure of the population 

Structure of the population (01.07.2005) (estimates):

Structure of the population (01.07.2010) (estimates) (projections based on the 2002 Population Census):

Structure of the population (2015):

Marriage and childbearing 
The legal age for females to get married in Guatemala was 14, but was raised to 16 with parental consent and 18 without in November 2015. This phenomenon, known as child marriage, is prevalent in Central America; in rural areas of Guatemala, 53% of 20 to 24 year-old women married before their 18th birthday. Once married, young girls are likely to abandon their education and are exposed to domestic and sexual violence. They are no longer seen as girls; their husbands, who are often older men, see them as servants. Frequently births are at home. Most of these women are isolated without networks of support.

In most cases, motherhood comes after marriage. However, due to the fact that these young women' bodies are not entirely developed, many pregnancies result in high complications and high risks for both the mother and baby, during and after labor.  Because there is limited access to health services, women in Guatemala choose a different alternative when it comes to the care during and after child delivery. Pregnancies before marriage are on the rise and unmarried women make their decision based on their image more than their safety. Single Guatemalan women may choose midwives as their health care provider during pregnancy and delivery to avoid feeling ashamed. Other women know the midwives in the community personally so they opt for a private healthcare provider. Throughout the country, midwives are known as the providers of choice for approximately 80% of the births even though they are not professionally trained. This contributes to the increasing infant mortality rate of 100 per 1,000 births as reported in some Guatemalan communities.

Other demographic statistics 
Demographic statistics according to the World Population Review in 2022.

One birth every 1 minutes	
One death every 6 minutes	
One net migrant every 58 minutes	
Net gain of one person every 2 minutes

Demographic statistics according to the CIA World Factbook, unless otherwise indicated.

Population
17,703,190 (2022 est.)
16,581,273 (July 2018 est.)

Ethnic groups
Mestizo (mixed Amerindian-Spanish - in local Spanish called Ladino) 56%, Maya 41.7%, Xinca (Indigenous, non-Maya) 1.8%, African descent 0.2%, Garifuna (mixed West and Central African, Island Carib, and Arawak) 0.1%, foreign 0.2% (2018 est.)

Age structure

0-14 years: 33.68% (male 2,944,145/female 2,833,432)
15-24 years: 19.76% (male 1,705,730/female 1,683,546)
25-54 years: 36.45% (male 3,065,933/female 3,186,816)
55-64 years: 5.41% (male 431,417/female 496,743)
65 years and over: 4.7% (male 363,460/female 442,066) (2020 est.) 

0-14 years: 34.55% (male 2,919,281 /female 2,810,329)
15-24 years: 20.23% (male 1,688,900 /female 1,665,631)
25-54 years: 35.47% (male 2,878,075 /female 3,002,920)
55-64 years: 5.28% (male 407,592 /female 468,335)
65 years and over: 4.46% (male 336,377 /female 403,833) (2018 est.)

Birth rate
22.34 births/1,000 population (2022 est.) Country comparison to the world: 56th
24.6 births/1,000 population (2018 est.) Country comparison to the world: 50th

Death rate
4.91 deaths/1,000 population (2022 est.) Country comparison to the world: 199th
5 deaths/1,000 population (2018 est.) Country comparison to the world: 194th

Total fertility rate
2.62 children born/woman (2022 est.) Country comparison to the world: 65th
2.87 children born/woman (2018 est.) Country comparison to the world: 58th

Median age
total: 23.2 years. Country comparison to the world: 178th
male: 22.6 years
female: 23.8 years (2020 est.)

total: 22.5 years. Country comparison to the world: 179th
male: 22 years 
female: 23.1 years (2018 est.)

Population growth rate
1.58% (2022 est.) Country comparison to the world: 63rd
1.72% (2018 est.) Country comparison to the world: 59th

Net migration rate 
-1.66 migrant(s)/1,000 population (2022 est.) Country comparison to the world: 162nd
-2.4 migrant(s)/1,000 population (2018 est.) Country comparison to the world: 168th

Mother's mean age at first birth 
20.6 years (2014/15 est.)
note: median age at first birth among women 25-49

Contraceptive prevalence rate
60.6% (2014/15)

Dependency ratios
total dependency ratio: 68.7 (2015 est.)
youth dependency ratio: 61.1 (2015 est.)
elderly dependency ratio: 7.6 (2015 est.)
potential support ratio: 13.1 (2015 est.)

Life expectancy at birth

total population: 72.91 years. Country comparison to the world: 150th
male: 70.88 years
female: 75.04 years (2022 est.)

total population: 71.8 years 
male: 69.8 years 
female: 73.9 years (2018 est.)

Major infectious diseases
degree of risk: high (2020)
food or waterborne diseases: bacterial diarrhea, hepatitis A, and typhoid fever
vectorborne diseases: dengue fever and malaria

Languages 
Spanish (official) 68.9%, Maya languages 30.9% (K'iche 8.7%, Q'eqchi 7%, Mam 4.6%, Kaqchikel 4.3%, other 6.3%), other 0.3% (includes Xinca and Garifuna) (2001 est.)
note: the 2003 Law of National Languages officially recognized 23 indigenous languages, including 21 Maya languages, Xinka, and Garifuna

Religions
Roman Catholic 41.7%, Evangelical 38.8%, other 2.7%, atheist 0.1%, none 13.8%, unspecified 2.9% (2018 est.)

Urbanization
urban population: 52.7% of total population (2022)
rate of urbanization: 2.59% annual rate of change (2020-25 est.)

urban population: 51.1% of total population (2018)
rate of urbanization: 2.68% annual rate of change (2015-20 est.)

Education expenditures
3.3% of GDP (2020) Country comparison to the world: 136th

Literacy
definition: age 15 and over can read and write (2015 est.)
total population: 80.8%
male: 85.3%
female: 76.7% (2018)

School life expectancy (primary to tertiary education)
total: 11 years
male: 11 years
female: 10 years (2019)

Unemployment, youth ages 15–24
total: 4.6%
male: 4%
female: 5.7% (2019 est.)

Languages

The official language of Guatemala is Spanish. It is spoken by nearly 93% of the population and is found mainly in the departments of the Southern region, Eastern region, Guatemala City and Peten. Though the official language is Spanish, it is often the second language among the Indigenous population.

Approximately 23 additional Amerindian languages are spoken by more than  40%  of the population.  21 Mayan languages, one indigenous, and one Arawakan are spoken in Guatemala. The most significant are; Quiche, Cakchiquel, Kekchi, Mam, Garifuna and Xinca.

There are also significant numbers of German, Chinese, French and English speakers.

Religion

Catholicism was the official religion during the colonial era, and today is the most professed church in the population, but since the 1960s, with the Armed Conflict, Protestantism has increased progressively, today around two fifths of Guatemalans are Protestant, specially Evangelicals (with Pentecostals as the biggest branch). Eastern and Oriental Orthodoxy claim rapid growth, especially among the Indigenous Maya. Other churches include the Church of Jesus Christ of Latter-day Saints, Jehovah's Witnesses, and other Christian minorities. More than 60% of Catholics and 80% of Protestants are actives members, today Catholicism and Protestantism are more unity to obtain the Politic control against globalization influence such as the acceptance of Homosexuality, abortion and other Human rights. Although Christianity is largely influential in public complex, since 1990 decade there are notable presence of non-religious people in surveys of religious identification. 

Indigenous beliefs are sometimes combined with Christianity. Maya religion believers only account for less than 0.1 % of the population and since the mid-1990s the Constitution recognizes the rights of Maya Religion. The Islamic community in Guatemala is growing, and is projected to include at least 2,000 believers by 2030. There is a mosque in Guatemala City called the Islamic Da'wah Mosque of Guatemala (Spanish: Mezquita de Aldawaa Islámica). The president of the Islamic Community of the country is Jamal Mubarak.

References